The Pakistan cricket team toured New Zealand from 31 January to 3 February 2015. The tour consisted of two 50-over Tour Matches and two One Day International matches which formed part of Pakistan’s preparation for the 2015 Cricket World Cup to be held in Australia and New Zealand. New Zealand won the series 2–0.

Squads

Tour Matches

50-over Tour Match

2nd 50-over Tour Match

ODI series

1st ODI

2nd ODI

References

External links
 Series home on ESPN Cricinfo

2015 in New Zealand cricket
2015 in Pakistani cricket
2014–15
International cricket competitions in 2014–15
2014–15 New Zealand cricket season